The Le Normand class (or E52 Type) was a class of 14 fast frigates (Escorteurs Rapide) built for the French Navy in the late 1950s.  They were an immediate follow-on from the earlier  Le Corse-class (or E50 Type) frigates, and like them, were long-range convoy escorts capable of high speed.  The first seven ships, paid for by the United States under the Mutual Defense Assistance Act were ordered in 1952. The remaining seven ships were paid for by France and ordered between 1953 and 1955.

The E52 type shared a flush-decked layout with the E50 class, and had a similar armament of three twin 57mm turrets) (one forward and two aft) and an anti-submarine armament consisting of a battery of heavyweight guided torpedoes and a 375mm Bofors six-barrel rocket launcher.  The major difference was the layout of the armament, with the torpedo tubes moving from forwards to amidships, and the Bofors launcher moving from amidships to forward of the bow gun, thus reducing topweight and improving the arc of fire for the Bofors launcher.

The last three ships were completed as a modified version, the Type E52B. This replaced the amidships turret and the Bofors rocket launcher with a new 305mm anti-submarine mortar mounted amidships.  Two more of this type were ordered in 1957, but were cancelled
owing to financial problems.

Ships

See also
List of Escorteurs of the French Navy

Notes

References

External links
 Description générale des escorteurs 

Frigate classes
Cold War frigates of France
Ship classes of the French Navy